KSUG is a radio station licensed to Heber Springs, Arkansas, broadcasting on 101.9 MHz FM, which signed on in May 2016.  Owned by Red River Radio, the station airs a classic hits format, originating mainly from Tom Kent's "24/7 Fun" network, with weekday mornings hosted locally by station co-owner, Ali King.

References

External links

Classic hits radio stations in the United States
SUG
Radio stations established in 2016
2016 establishments in Arkansas